A whale fall occurs when the carcass of a whale has fallen onto the ocean floor at a depth greater than , in the bathyal or abyssal zones. On the sea floor, these carcasses can create complex localized ecosystems that supply sustenance to deep-sea organisms for decades. This is unlike in shallower waters, where a whale carcass will be consumed by scavengers over a relatively short period of time. Whale falls were first observed in the late 1970s with the development of deep-sea robotic exploration. Since then, several natural and experimental whale falls have been monitored through the use of observations from submersibles and remotely operated underwater vehicles (ROVs) in order to understand patterns of ecological succession on the deep seafloor.

Deep sea whale falls are thought to be hotspots of adaptive radiation for specialized fauna. Organisms that have been observed at deep-sea whale fall sites include octopus, giant isopods, squat lobsters, polychaetes, prawns, shrimp, lobsters, hagfish, Osedax, crabs, sea cucumbers, and sleeper sharks. New species have been discovered, including some potentially specializing in whale falls. It has been postulated that whale falls generate biodiversity by providing evolutionary stepping stones for multiple lineages to move and adapt to new environmentally-challenging habitats. Researchers estimate that 690,000 carcasses/skeletons of the nine largest whale species are in one of the four stages of succession at any one time. They hypothesize that this distance is short enough to allow larvae to disperse/migrate from one to another.

Whale falls are able to occur in the deep open ocean due to cold temperatures and high hydrostatic pressures. In the coastal ocean, a higher incidence of predators as well as warmer waters hasten the decomposition of whale carcasses. Carcasses may also float due to decompositional gases, keeping the carcass at the surface. The bodies of most great whales (which includes sperm whales and many species of baleen whale) are slightly denser than the surrounding seawater, and only become positively buoyant when the lungs are filled with air. When the lungs deflate, the whale carcasses can reach the seafloor quickly and relatively intact due to a lack of significant whale fall scavengers in the water column. Once in the deep-sea, cold temperatures slow decomposition rates, and high hydrostatic pressures increase gas solubility, allowing whale falls to remain intact and sink to even greater depths.

Contribution to the biological pump 
The amount of carbon tied up in a typical single whale carcass (about two tonnes of carbon for a typical 40-tonne carcass) is roughly equivalent to the amount of carbon exported to a hectare of abyssal ocean floor in 100–200 years. This amount of organic material reaching the seafloor at one time creates a pulse equivalent to about 2000 years of background carbon flux in the 50 square meters of sediment immediately beneath the whale fall. This helps to sustain the community structure that develops around a whale fall, but it also has potential implications for the biological pump, or the flux of organic material from the surface ocean to depth.

Whales and some other large marine animals feed on and follow large aggregations of zooplankton for sustenance. Based on simple trophic structure, this would mean whales and other large zooplankton feeders can be found at higher abundance around areas of high primary production, potentially making them important exporters of carbon to depth through food falls. Biological pump models indicate that a large amount of carbon uptake by the deep sea is not supplied by particulate organic carbon (POC) alone, and must come from another source. Lateral advection of carbon, especially in coastal areas contributes to this deficit in the model, but food falls are also another source of organic carbon for the deep ocean. Various percentages of the food fall contribution to the total carbon flux to the deep ocean have been hypothesized, ranging from 0.3% to 4%.

There is growing evidence that the contribution of food falls to the deep ocean carbon flux is larger than originally proposed, especially on the local scale in areas of high primary productivity. Unfortunately, contributions of food falls to the biological pump are hard to measure and rely on a few serendipitous studies on discovered falls as well as planted carcasses with much of the deep sea carbon flux studies relying on sediment traps.

Discovery 

The earliest indication that whale carcasses could host specialized animal communities occurred in 1854 when a new mussel species was extracted from a piece of floating whale blubber. By the 1960s, deep sea trawlers unintentionally recovered other new mollusc species including limpets (named Osteopelta) attached to whale bones.

The first recorded abyssal whale fall was discovered by US Navy bathyscaphe pilots LT Ken Hanson, Master Chief George Ellis and LT Tom Vetter diving in bathyscaphe Trieste II (DSV-1) on 19 February 1977. The skeleton of the carcass, which was completely devoid of organic tissue, remained intact and collapsed flat on the seafloor. The submersible recovered a jawbone and phalanges. The whale was considered to be a gray whale based on the size of the bones and the skeleton, the lack of teeth and its location west of Santa Catalina.

The first whale-fall ecosystem, which included a chemoautotrophic assemblage living on the anaerobic breakdown of organic material in whale bones, was discovered by a team of scientists led by University of Hawaii oceanographer Craig Smith in 1987.

Many other whale falls have since been found by more researchers and deep-sea explorers as well as naval submarines. The increase in detection is largely due to the use of cutting-edge side-scan sonar which can minutely examine the ocean floor for large aggregations of matter. A 2022 study identified 45 known natural whale falls, 38 implanted ones, and 78 fossil ones with most in the Pacific but a significant number, particularly of fossil ones in the Atlantic.

Ecology 

Whale falls are distributed heterogeneously throughout space and time, with a concentration along migration routes. There is much faunal overlap in these whale falls across oceans. Mussels and vesicomyid clams belong to groups that harbor chemosynthetic bacteria, which can draw energy from inorganic chemicals, such as sulfur. Before their presence was discovered at whale falls, the only known habitats of these groups were sunken wood and hydrothermal vents. Similarly, lucinid clams were previously only known to inhabit carbon seeps and anoxic seafloor sediments. Osedax, a genus of deep-sea polychaete worms, act as ecosystem engineers by excreting acid to erode whale bones and absorbing the nutrients trapped within. This enhances biodiversity in the deep sea by increasing the water diffusion into the matrix of bones and facilitating colonization of the bone matrix by rarer species. Osedax have more dramatic effects in juvenile skeletons, which are not as well-calcified as adult skeletons.

At whale fall sites it is common to see between three and five trophic levels present, with two main nutritional sources constituting the base of the food web. Adult whale carcasses can house up to five trophic levels, whereas juveniles more typically have three.

Recent studies also show a possible trend of "dual niche partitioning", in which scavengers tend to reach peak densities on the carcass during the day and predators are more present during the night, reducing competition between the two trophic groups. There is also a possible trend in tidal patterns and species occurrence, indicating that tides play a role in niche partitioning as well.

Similar ecosystems exist when other large volumes of nutrient-rich material fall to the sea floor. Sunken beds of kelp create kelp falls, and large trees can sink to create wood falls. In more recent years, shipwrecks have also provided bases for deepwater communities. In ecosystems formed following a whale fall event, there are four stages of ecological succession.

Ecosystem stages 
There are four stages of decomposition associated with a whale fall. These stages vary in duration and overlap with one other with the size of the carcass, water depth, and other environmental variables, such as tidal flow. Large, intact whale falls appear to pass through the four decomposition stages, while the stages on smaller or partial carcasses may be truncated. Smaller cetaceans, such as porpoises and dolphins, do not undergo the same ecological succession stages due to their small size and lower lipid content. Researchers believe the presence of Osedax worms may also be a contributing factor in the observed successional differences.

Stage 1
The initial period begins with "mobile scavengers" such as hagfish and sleeper sharks actively consuming soft tissue from the carcass. This stage typically lasts months up to 1.5 years.

Stage 2
The second stage introduces the "enrichment opportunists". These are animals which colonize the bones and surrounding sediments that have been contaminated with organic matter from the carcass and any other tissue left by the scavengers. This stage can last months up to 4.5 years.

Stage 3
In the third stage, sulfophilic bacteria anaerobically break down the lipids embedded in the bones. Instead of oxygen, they reduce dissolved sulfate and excrete hydrogen sulfide. The bacterial mats provide nourishment for mussels, clams, limpets and sea snails. As whale bones are rich in lipids, representing 4–6% of its body weight, the final digestion stage can last between 50 and possibly 100 years.

Stage 4 
Some scientists postulate a fourth stage of ecological succession at whale fall sites, called the "reef stage". A whale fall enters this stage once the organic compounds have been exhausted and only minerals remain in the bones, which provide a hard substrate for suspension and filter feeders.

Methanogenesis 
A process called methanogenesis can also occur around whale falls. Archaea that produce methane can be abundant in anoxic sediment, but are typically not found in co-occurrence with the sulfur reducing bacteria found at whale falls. Whale falls do however support both sulfur reducing bacteria and methane producing archaea, leading to the conclusion that the area is not electron donor limited, and/or there is minimal or no competition for suitable substrate. Concentration gradients of both sulfide and methane can be found around whale falls, with the highest concentration coming within one meter of the carcass, which is several orders of magnitude higher than the surrounding sediment concentrations. Methanogenesis appears to only occur in sediments as opposed to sulfur reduction, which occurs both in sediments and on the bones of the carcass. The addition of sulfur reduction in both sediments and high lipid whale bones is a key factor for why whale falls are able to sustain deep-sea communities for extended periods of time.

Paleontology 
Whale fall fossils from the late Eocene and Oligocene (34–23 MYA) in Washington and from the Pliocene in Italy include clams that also inhabited non-chemosynthetic environments. Chemosynthetic-only animals do not appear until the Miocene (23–5 MYA) in California and Japan. This may be because the lipid content of early whale bones was too low. As prehistoric whales evolved to live in pelagic waters and dive deeper, structural changes in their anatomy included increased size, reduced bone density and higher lipid content. It is this increased lipid content that led to the establishment of chemosynthetic communities in the deep sea.

The discovery of the limpet Osteopelta in an Eocene New Zealand turtle bone indicates that these animals evolved before whales, including possibly inhabiting Mesozoic (251–66 MYA) reptiles. They may have survived in seeps, wood-falls and vents while waiting out the 20 million year gap between the reptiles' extinction and whales' emergence. Another possibility is that these fossils represent a prior, dead-end evolutionary path, and that today's whale fall animals evolved independently.

Anthropogenic effects 

It has been suggested that the whaling industry has had an effect on the biological pump through the elimination of many large whales, reducing the amount of whale falls. The effects of this on benthic whale fall community assemblages is not well understood. However, it is suggested that the removal of large whales might have reduced the total biomass of the deep sea by more than 30%. Whales stored massive amounts of carbon that were exported to the deep sea during whale fall events. Whaling has thus also reduced the ability of the deep sea to sequester carbon. Carbon can be sequestered for hundreds to thousands of years in the deep sea, supporting benthic communities. It is estimated that, in terms of carbon sequestration, each whale is equivalent to thousands of trees.

Contrast with other large food-falls 
There have also been studies based on the carcasses of other, non-mammalian marine vertebrates that have fallen to the deep sea. In particular, the chance discovery of a whale shark carcass and three mobulid ray carcasses led to observations on the communities that form surrounding large elasmobranch falls as opposed to whale falls. Whale sharks inhabit waters of roughly 1,000 meters depth regularly, which suggests it could be a regular form of food fall in areas where it is abundant. Many eelpouts (Zoarcidae) were found surrounding the whale shark with some evidence of direct feeding as boreholes were observed on the carcass. Another theory suggests that the eelpouts were waiting for their main prey, amphipods and other small benthic animals. The three rays found were at different stages of decomposition, leading to varying assemblages found surrounding the individuals. A higher abundance of scavengers was found surrounding the more intact individuals, including scavengers typical of whale falls like hagfish. Around the least intact individual a bacterial mat was observed in the zone of enrichment, but no clams or mussels typical of whale falls were seen.

Overall, the four carcasses observed showed no evidence of progression past the scavenger stage. The size limitations, as well as physiological differences between large elasmobranchs and whales more than likely causes the changes observed in the communities surrounding their respective carcasses. Osedax worms have the ability to extract collagen from bones as well as lipids, enabling them to sustain themselves on bones other than the lipid-rich remains of whales. Although no Osedax were found on the non-mammalian remains in this study, their absence may have been due to the timing of observation, and the Osedax had not yet colonized the carcasses. Various studies on smaller cetaceans and other marine vertebrate food falls come to similar conclusions that these falls bring a large amount of new organic material to depth, but support mostly a scavenger community, as opposed to the diverse assemblage seen at whale falls. This conclusion can be drawn based on the knowledge that large whales have much higher lipid content in their bulk composition and bone marrow, which supports the diverse communities present in succession at whale falls.

Researchers have compared sauropod carcasses to modern whale-fall events, recognizing that sauropods reached the size of modern cetaceans.  Sauropod carcasses may have been energy rich reservoirs, and because they did not float great distances, may have been the primary resources of many terrestrial carnivorous dinosaurs.

See also 

 Deep sea communities
 Marine snow
 Detritivore
 Jelly-falls
 Whaling
 Osedax
 Carbon sequestration
 Deep-sea wood

References

External links 
 Smith and Baco 2003 paper on whale fall ecology (University of Hawaii)
 Article from NOAA's Undersea Research program (NURP) 
 Robin Meadows, "A Whale of a Tale"
 (Science Daily), University of California, Berkeley, "Fossil Whale Puts Limit On Origin of Oily, Buoyant Bones In Whales" 14 September 2007

Animal death
Aquatic ecology
Whales